The Motorola C390 is a low-cost 900/1800/1900-band GSM mobile phone, manufactured by Motorola. It was released in the fourth quarter of 2004 as a successor to the C385. Main difference is the availability of bluetooth with the C390. Dimensions are 107 x 44 x 20.9 mm, weight is 91 g. It was available in Dark Blue Green Soft Feel and  Dark Roast Black.

Main features 
 Downloadable wallpaper, screensaver and ringtones
 MMS, EMS and SMS
 WAP 2.0 and GPRS for Internet access
 1.8 mb internal memory
 CSTN-display with 65.000 colours, 128 x 128 pixels, 5 lines
 Java, MIDP 2.0
 Bluetooth, v1.1
 phonebook with 500 entries
 GPRS (Class 10 - 32-48 kbit/s)
 USB
 iTap

C390
Mobile phones introduced in 2004